Wayne Douglas Barlowe is an American science fiction and fantasy writer, painter, and concept artist. Barlowe's work focuses on esoteric landscapes and creatures such as citizens of hell and alien worlds. He has painted over 300 book and magazine covers and illustrations for many major book publishers, as well as Life magazine, Time magazine, and Newsweek. His 1979 book Barlowe’s Guide to Extraterrestrials was nominated in 1980 for the Hugo Award for Best Related Non-Fiction Book, the first year that award category was awarded. It also won the 1980 Locus Award for Best Art or Illustrated Book. His 1991 speculative evolution book Expedition was nominated for the 1991 Chesley Award for Artistic Achievement.

Barlowe has worked as a concept artist for movies such as Galaxy Quest (1999), Avatar (2009), and Aquaman (2018), among others. He is known to work closely with Guillermo Del Toro, serving as a creature designer for the Hellboy film series and the head creature designer for Pacific Rim (2013). His work on Hellboy (2004) awarding him a nomination for the 2005 Chesley Award for Product Illustration. Barlowe was the creator and executive producer of Alien Planet, a documentary adaptation of Expedition produced by Discovery Channel in 2005. He has written two fantasy novels: God’s Demon (Tor Books, 2007) and its sequel The Heart of Hell (2019).

References

External links

Alien Planet at DiscoveryChannel.com

Living people
20th-century American painters
American male painters
21st-century American novelists
21st-century American painters
21st-century American male artists
American male novelists
American science fiction writers
American speculative fiction artists
Science fiction artists
Fantasy artists
Year of birth missing (living people)
21st-century American male writers
20th-century American male artists